Kidiliz Group, formerly Groupe Zannier, was a French firm composed of ready-to-wear brands. Its main market was children's clothing.

History and description 
The Kidiliz Group was founded in 1962 by Roger Zannier and has purchased existing brands over the years. There are more than 20 brands owned by the group or under licence.

December 1, 2016 : Groupe Zannier became Kidiliz Group The company has a portfolio of 15 brands, including Catimini Z, Absorba, Chipie and Lili Gaufrette.

In May 2017 the CEO Rémy Baume announced  to merge the Kidiliz Group with the Semir Group, one of Chinas biggest manufacturers for children's clothing. The Semir Group will hold 80 percent of the new company.

In 2019 the Kilidiz Group filed for bankruptcy.

Brands

Children clothing

 3 Pommes
 
 Esprit
 Alphabet
 Beckaro
 
 Chillaround
 
 Confetti
 Dim
 Jean Bourget
 Junior Gaultier (brand under licence)
 Kidiliz
 Paul Smith Junior (brand under licence)
 Kenzo (brand under licence)
 Levi's (brand under licence)
 Lili Gaufrette
 Myfirstdressing

References

External links 
 
Le Journal du Net, 11.10.2011 (in french)
 Modes.es

Clothing brands
Clothing retailers of France
Children's clothing retailers
Companies based in Paris